Fanuj County is in Sistan and Baluchestan province, Iran. The capital of the county is the city of Fanuj. At the 2006 census, the region's population (as Fanuj District of Nik Shahr County) was 38,459 in 8,450 households. The following census in 2011 counted 45,637 people in 10,979 households. At the 2016 census, the county's population was 49,161 in 12,604 households, by which time the district had been separated from the county to form Fanuj County.

Administrative divisions

The population history and structural changes of Fanuj County's administrative divisions over three consecutive censuses are shown in the following table. The latest census shows two districts, four rural districts, and one city.

References

 

Counties of Sistan and Baluchestan Province